Langhaugane is a village along the river Jølstra in Sunnfjord Municipality in Vestland county, Norway.

References

Villages in Vestland
Sunnfjord